The East Branch Penobscot River is a  tributary of Maine's Penobscot River. It flows in Piscataquis County and Penobscot County.

Course

Matagamon Lake

Grand Lake Matagamon or Matagamon Lake is a reservoir on the East Branch, impounded by Grand Lake Dam. The dam was built at the outlet of First Lake, and flooded vast expanses of low-lying land extending upstream to include Second Lake.

The shallow water habitat created by the dam is more suitable for yellow perch, fallfish, and longnose sucker rather than for trout.

See also

List of rivers of Maine

References

Maine Streamflow Data from the USGS
Maine Watershed Data From Environmental Protection Agency

Rivers of Penobscot County, Maine
Rivers of Piscataquis County, Maine
North Maine Woods
Rivers of Maine